Milton Hector Trinidad Gonzalez, born in Montevideo, Uruguay, on May 16, 1939, is a former football player and coach.

College
From 1958 he studied at the Faculty of Dentistry of Montevideo (Uruguay), having worked in his native country for a long time in his dental office. He also studied for football, national category, receiving his degree in 1971.

Playing career

While at the dental college in Montevideo, Uruguay he played on several occasions, for the University  world championship of his category in Jakarta, Indonesia. The “National Club of Football” also contracted him to integrate its team in the youth sector. Thereafter, he continued his career in the following professional teams:

He played in the following professional teams:

Coaching career

Finished the championship league of Ontario, Canada, defending the colors of Sudbury Italy, Milton returns to his country to follow the course of national soccer coach. It is then, when the military Seleccion of Uruguay hires him. Subsequently, the FIFA agent, Dr. Pier Luigi Salvini, now deceased, began also to represent him for different teams placed in various parts of the world.

Titles obtained

As player:

As trainer:

Today

Milton taught courses for coaches in the City of Portoviejo (Manabi, Ecuador)

He also instructed talks about tactics to football coaches in Brazil, the United States, Uruguay and Canada from 2003-2005.

Since 2005, Milton is in Cehegin (Murcia, Spain), with his wife Ana Maria and his two children, Massimiliano and Nathalie, where he works as a presenter for a television program, sport and culture, entitled "Tuesdays with Milton," which can be seen throughout the Northwest Region of Murcia. His third son, and the eldest, also called Milton, lives in Portugal with his family.

Books published

"Futbol, solo habilidad?" Editorial Hispano Europea of Barcelona (Spain), 1973

"Entreainement sud-american" Chiron editions (Paris, France), 1975

External links

To know a little about the passing of Milton by Caravaca FC visit: https://web.archive.org/web/20110708120210/http://www.caravacaclubdefutbol.com/noticia.asp?id=41

For a conversation with Milton: http://cdcaminoalagloria.blogspot.com/2008/11/la-tertulia-con-milton-trinidad.html

New presentation of cultural and sports program, "Tuesdays with Milton" https://www.youtube.com/watch?v=gdyVubLpWfQ

1939 births
Living people
Uruguayan footballers
Association football forwards